Biju George (born 1 February 1966), is an Indian cricketer and current Delhi Capitals fielding coach. Before appointment in coaching panel of Delhi Capitals, George also served as fielding coach for Sunrisers Hyderabad, Indian Woman cricket team and Indian U19 team.

Biju is a Level III certification in coaching from the National Cricket Academy (NCA) of the Board of Control for Cricket in India(BCCI), Since 1992 he is coach with Sports Authority of India(SAI)

Biju is a former fielding coach of the India women's team and has worked with the team's recent coaches - Tushar Arothe, WV Raman and Ramesh Powar. The coach from Trivandrum was associated with Kolkata Knight Riders for two years (2015 and 2016) and Sunrisers Hyderabad for a year in 2020. In between, he had also coached the Kuwait national team.

Biju George has been appointed as the new fielding coach for the Indian Premier League (IPL) 2022 season. He will take over for Mohammad Kaif, a former India cricketer who occupied the seat until the previous season. Biju will take part in the coaching group that includes head coach Ricky Ponting, his colleagues Shane Watson & James Hopes, as well as former India batsmen Ajit Agarkar & Pravin Amre.

Previous Coaching Assignments :

●	Under-19 KeralaState Team - 1991
●	Under-25 KeralaState Team - 1991
●	Under-16 KeralaState Team - 1999
●	Under-14 KeralaState Team - 2001 
●	Under-15 KeralaState Team - 2003
●	Under-19 KeralaState Team - 2004 
●	Under-19 KeralaState Team - 2005 
●	Under-22 KeralaState Team - 2006
●	Under-22 KeralaState Team - 2007
●	Ranji Trophy KeralaState Team 2008 (FieldingCoach)
●	Under-16 NCA National Camp - 2008/09 (FC)
●	Ranji Trophy KeralaState Team 2009 (assistant coach)
●	Under-22 Kerala State Team – 2010/11
●	Ranji Trophy Kerala State Team 2011/12
●	Duleep Trophy South Zone – 2010/11(South Zone wins the title after 15 years)
●	Syed Mushtaq Ali Trophy (T/20) Kerala State Team - 2010 (Kerala played Quarter Final)
●	Has helped in conduct of level-1 coaching classes for the Kerala Cricket Association
●	Has designed and conducted level-O coaching classes for the  Kerala Cricket Association
●	India Under-19s Women lead Coach – 2013.
●	Fielding coach for the India under 19 team for the Asia cup(Winners) 2014
●	Fielding coach for the India under 19 team for the World cup held in UAE 2014
●	Coach of the NCA under 23 team which won the KSCA tournament 2014
●	Coach of the Kuwait National Team for the Asian Cricket Council T20 Cup in January 2015.
●	Support staff of Kolkata Knight Riders IPL 2016
●	Support staff of Kolkata Knight Riders IPL 2017
●	Fielding Coach of Indian Women Team from June 2017 to October 2019
●	Fielding coach of Indian women team which were runners up in ICC 50 Overs World cup at England 2017
●	Fielding coach of Indian women team which were runners up in Asian Women T20 in Malaysia 2018
●	Fielding coach of Indian women team which were the semi-finalist in the ICC World T20 in West Indies 2018

References

Indian cricket coaches
1955 births
Living people